William Knight (born 26 July 1951) is a retired British boxer.

Boxing career
He competed in the men's middleweight event at the 1972 Summer Olympics. In his first fight, he defeated Julius Luipa of Zambia, before losing to Alejandro Montoya of Cuba in the next round.

He represented England and won a gold medal in the light heavyweight division, at the 1974 British Commonwealth Games in Christchurch, New Zealand.

Knight won the Amateur Boxing Association 1972, 1973 and 1974 light heavyweight title, when boxing out of the Lynn ABC.

References

External links
 

1951 births
Living people
Middleweight boxers
Light-heavyweight boxers
British male boxers
Olympic boxers of Great Britain
Boxers at the 1972 Summer Olympics
Boxers at the 1974 British Commonwealth Games
Commonwealth Games gold medallists for England
Commonwealth Games medallists in boxing
Place of birth missing (living people)
People from Saint Kitts
Saint Kitts and Nevis emigrants to the United Kingdom
Medallists at the 1974 British Commonwealth Games